Eumeta variegata, commonly known as the paulownia bagworm or cotton bag worm, is a moth of the family Psychidae. The species was first described by Snellen in 1879. It is found in Japan, Papua New Guinea, India, the Solomon Islands and Sri Lanka.

Description
Adults show strong sexual dimorphism. Adult females lack wings and live throughout their life in the larval case. Adult males have functional wings. This is due to that during final instar larvae, male show normal wing discs, whereas those of the female show rudimentary. The protective is about 5 cm in length. The silk is composed entirely of Glycine-Alanine repeats and poly-Alanine stretches.

In the male, wing discs proliferate rapidly in the eighth instar and continue proliferating. A conspicuous peripodial epithelium forms and the hemopoietic organs break down and disappear completely by the prepupal stage. Whereas in female, the wing discs remain as in the seventh instar, without proliferation of cells inside. Therefore, there is no peripodial epithelium formation and the hemopoietic organs are still attached to the wing discs. Finally the entire wing discs transform into a plain, thick epidermis in the prepupal period.

Molecular basis
In 2018, the complete mitochondrial genome of the moth was sequenced using a nanopore sequencer as a single long read. It is the second report of a complete mitochondrial genome of psychid species.

Ecology
It is a known pest of Citrus and tea cultivation, though it is considered to be polyphagous. It also a known pest of mango, cashew, casuarina, cinnamon, Shorea robusta.

The natural parasites of the species include: Apanteles claniae, Aulosaphes fujianensis, Chouioia cunea, Exorista japonica, Nealsomyia rufella, Sarcophaga caudagalli, and Sclerodermus guani. Pathogens are Bacillus thuringiensis and Nucleopolyhedrosis virus.

Host plants

 Acacia mangium
 Albizia
 Baccaurea ramiflora
 Camellia sinensis
 Casuarina equisetifolia
 Casuarina junghuhniana
 Ceiba pentandra
 Cinnamomum camphora
 Citrus
 Derris
 Hevea brasiliensis
 Hibiscus
 Lagerstroemia
 Mangifera indica
 Manihot esculenta
 Musa paradisiaca
 Myristica fragrans
 Palaquium
 Paraserianthes falcataria
 Peltophorum
 Pinus markusii
 Pinus roxburghii
 Piper
 Podocarpus macrophyllus
 Psidium guajava
 Ricinus
 Shorea robusta
 Theobroma cacao
 Uncaria gambir
 Vitis

References

External links
Bionomics of Bagworms
Female-specific wing degeneration is triggered by ecdysteroid in cultures of wing discs from the bagworm moth, Eumeta variegata
The complete mitochondrial genome of Eumeta variegata
In vitro effects of juvenile hormone analog on wing disc morphogenesis under ecdysteroid treatment in the female-wingless bagworm moth Eumeta variegata

Moths of Asia
Moths described in 1879
Psychidae